The Miage Glacier is a debris-covered glacier in the upper Aosta Valley, in northwestern Italy.

Description 
It is situated on the southwest flank of the Mont Blanc massif, flowing from the Col de Bionnassay ( above sea level) in a generally southerly direction towards Val Veny. Its most northerly arm or tributary is the Glacier de Bionnassay Italien, which arises from a cirque between the south eastern side of the Aiguille de Bionnassay, the Col de Bionnassay and the Calotte des Aiguille Grises. This descends for 2.5 km below the Col Infranchissible then turns south-east to merge with other glaciers, thence continuing as the Glacier du Miage (Ghiacciaio del Miage).

Approximately  of its total area of ~ is covered in debris originating primarily in rockfall from surrounding walls and avalanching in accumulation areas of its four tributaries. Debris carried along within the glacier is also being exposed at increased rates due to accelerating thinning of the glacier tongue.

The number of sources of supraglacial debris as well as the unusual, mica schist-dominated lithology of the rock walls surrounding the glacier, makes for a varied debris lithology; debris cover becomes continuous at ~ above mean sea level (asl) and remains unbroken to the terminus. Patchy areas can occur, however, where crevasses or moulins occur.

Miage Lake

Miage Lake is an ice-contact lake near the southern end of the Miage Glacier, located on the outside of the glacier's 90-degree bend eastwards. It is a popular tourist attraction due to the spectacular ice cliffs rising up to one side and its two-coloured appearance. The colours reflect varying sediment concentrations in the water which arise as a result of the filtering effect of the debris.

Huge ice blocks have been known to break off the glacier and fall into the lake, providing another major tourist attraction despite the low chance of such an event occurring. On August 7, 1996, a particularly large block, estimated to have had a volume of 7000-16000m3, fell into the lake causing an abnormally large wave that seriously injured several people. The incident was caught on camera by at least one tourist.

References

Glaciers of Italy
Glaciers of the Alps